The Bede BD-22L is an American kit-built homebuilt aircraft.

Design and development
The BD-22L is a two-seat, low wing, tricycle gear aircraft. It can be flown with the canopy open. The prototype N224BD first flew in March 2015, but suffered a fatal accident on April 1, 2015 in St. Lucie County, Florida. The development appears to have ended.

Specifications (BD-22L)

References

Homebuilt aircraft
Low-wing aircraft
Single-engined tractor aircraft
Aircraft first flown in 2015